Die Manns – Ein Jahrhundertroman (The Manns – Novel of a Century) is a 2001 German Docudrama-miniseries directed by Heinrich Breloer.

The miniseries is divided in three parts and tells the story of the Mann family, a family of famous writers. It deals with their personal life (passions, tragedies, rivalities), opposition to the Nazis and emigration into the United States from Nazi Germany. Between the fictional scenes, the miniseries also includes interviews with members of the Mann family and their friends. Elisabeth Mann Borgese, the only living child of Thomas Mann at the time of the filming, is shown on various locations of the film, interviewed about her family by director Breloer.

Cast 
Armin Mueller-Stahl as Thomas Mann
Jürgen Hentsch as Heinrich Mann
Monica Bleibtreu as Katia Mann
Sebastian Koch as Klaus Mann
Sophie Rois as Erika Mann
Veronica Ferres as Nelly Kröger
Stefanie Stappenbeck as Monika Mann
Philipp Hochmair as Golo Mann
Katharina Eckerfeld as Elisabeth Mann Borgese
Rüdiger Klink as Michael Mann
Anne-Marie Blanc as Hedwig Pringsheim
Rudolf Wessely as Alfred Pringsheim
Katharina Thalbach as Therese Giehse
Torben Liebrecht as Thomas Quinn Curtiss
Hans-Michael Rehberg as Giuseppe Antonio Borgese
Gerd David as Gustaf Gründgens
Andrea Sawatzki as Pamela Wedekind
Ludwig Blochberger as Klaus Heuser
Hildegard Schmahl as Salka Viertel
Norbert Schwientek as Joseph Roth

Awards

References

External links
 

German-language television shows
2000s German television miniseries
2001 German television series debuts
2001 German television series endings
Television series set in the 1920s
Television series set in the 1930s
Television series set in the 1940s
Television series set in the 1950s
Das Erste original programming
International Emmy Award for Best TV Movie or Miniseries
Grimme-Preis for fiction winners
Films about Nobel laureates
Thomas Mann
2001 films